Xylopine is an antimicrobial benzylisoquinoline alkaloid.

References

Aporphine alkaloids
Dibenzoquinolines
Benzodioxoles